Platymantis isarog, sometimes known as the Isarog forest frog, is a species of frog in the family Ceratobatrachidae. It is endemic to southeastern Luzon, Philippines, where it is known from two volcanos, Mount Isarog (its type locality) and Mount Malinao.

Description
Adult males measure  and adult females  in snout–vent length. The snout is broadly rounded. The tympanum is distinct. The fingers have no webbing whereas the toes are webbed. The hind limbs are moderately long. The dorsum has grayish to orange brown background color and is marked with varied darker spots and blotches. Some specimens have a pale vertebral line starting from the beginning on the snout. The hind limbs have dark transverse bars. There are yellowish, brown-ringed s in the groin, on the thighs, and frequently the lower legs. The venter has brown spots or reticulations (this species was originally named as P. reticulatus in reference to the latter).

Habitat and conservation
It deposits its eggs on leaves in shrub layer vegetation. The egg have direct development (i.e, there is no free-living larval stage).

This species is common in mid- to upper-montane forests on Mount Isarog, and the population there appears to be stable; it is well-protected by the Mount Isarog National Park. There is geothermal power generation on the slopes of Mount Malinao, but its impact is limited. Thus, despite its limited distribution, this species is not considered threatened by the IUCN SSC Amphibian Specialist Group.

References

isarog
Amphibians of the Philippines
Endemic fauna of the Philippines
Fauna of Luzon
Amphibians described in 1997
Taxa named by Angel Chua Alcala
Taxa named by Rafe M. Brown
Taxa named by Walter Creighton Brown
Taxa named by Darrel Frost
Taxonomy articles created by Polbot